Michael Bach (born 10 April 1950) is a German scientist who researches ophthalmology, clinical electroencephalography, clinical electroretinography, visual acuity testing, and visual perception. Bach is the creator of website Optical Illusions & Visual Phenomena, which received over two million hits a day in 2005.

Life and work 
Bach was born in Berlin on 10 April 1950. In 1956 he moved with his family to Dortmund, where he attended school. From 1970 to 1972, Bach completed an undergraduate degree in physics at Ruhr University Bochum, then moved to the University of Freiburg, where he studied for a Master's degree in physics. In 1975, he began a part-time position running an electronics workshop in the Department of Psychology, then began as a full-time research assistant in the Department of Neurology in 1978. Bach was awarded his Master's in physics in 1977 and his PhD, also in physics, in 1981, on the visual system. In 1981 he moved into a full-time position in the Department of Ophthalmology, rising to Professor in 1998, and being appointed as Head of Section Visual Function/Electrophysiology at the University Eye Hospital in 1999. After Bach's retirement in 2015 he became an Emeritus Scientist, continuing his research.

In 1996, Bach began his service to the International Society for Clinical Electrophysiology of Vision, establishing, with others, standards for clinical electroencephalography, electroretinography and electrooculography, and becoming the society's president from 2004 to 2011.

In 1975, Bach married Ulrike Röhling. They have three adult children and one grandchild.

Research 

Bach has conducted research in ophthalmology, electroretinography, and visual perception. One strand of his research has been to develop tests of visual acuity, using verbal responding or using brain activity.

As of April 2021, Bach has published 356 scientific papers that have been cited 16602 times, giving him an h-index of 61. According to Neurotree, Bach has 16 academic children and 44 academic grandchildren.

Illusions 

Bach began his illusions web site as a hobby some time before 2005. He did not appreciate how popular the site was until he discovered that his internet service provider had suspended his account after it received more than one million hits per day. Bach upgraded his account and continued developing the site.

As of April, 2021, Bach's site contained 143 illusions, most interactive, and all with Bach's clear explanations. The site and Bach have won plaudits on the internet, in the news media, and in science journals.

The site has also been used in scientific research into illusions.

Selected works

 M. F. Marmor, A. B. Fulton, G. E. Holder, Y. Miyake, M. Brigell, M. Bach: ISCEV Standard for full-field clinical electroretinography (2008 update). In: Documenta Ophthalmologica. Band 118, Nr. 1, 2009. S. 69–77.
 M. Bach: The Freiburg Visual Acuity test – automatic measurement of visual acuity. In: Optometry and vision science. Band 73, Nr. 1, 1996. S. 49–53
 J.V. Odom, M. Bach, M. Brigell, G.E. Holder, D.L. McCulloch, A.P. Tormene: ISCEV standard for clinical visual evoked potentials (2009 update). In: Documenta ophthalmologica. Band 120, Nr. 1, 2010. S. 111–119.
 D. L. McCulloch, M. F. Marmor, M. G. Brigell, R. Hamilton, G. E. Holder, R. Tzekov, M. Bach: ISCEV Standard for full-field clinical electroretinography (2015 update). In: Documenta ophthalmologica. Band 130, Nr. 1, 2015. S. 1–12.
 J. V. Odom, M. Bach, C. Barber, M. Brigell, M. F. Marmor, A. P. Tormene, G. E. Holder: Visual evoked potentials standard (2004). In: Documenta ophthalmologica. Band 108, Nr. 2, 2004. S. 115–123.
 K. Schulze-Bonsel, N. Feltgen, H. Burau, L. Hansen, M. Bach: Visual acuities “hand motion” and “counting fingers” can be quantified with the Freiburg visual acuity test. In: Investigative Ophthalmology & Visual Science. Band 47, Nr. 3, 2006. S. 1236–1240.
 D. C. Hood, M. Bach, M. Brigell, D. Keating, M. Kondo, J. S. Lyons, M. F. Marmor, D. L. McCulloch, A. M. Palmowski-Wolfe: ISCEV standard for clinical multifocal electroretinography (mfERG) (2011 edition). In: Documenta Ophthalmologica. Band 124, Nr. 1, 2012. S. 1–13.
 R. Heckenlively, G.B. Arden, (Hrsg.), S. Nusinowitz, G. Holder, M. Bach (Mitherausg.): Principles and practice of clinical electrophysiology of vision. MIT press 2006.
 M. Bach, M. G. Brigell, M. Hawlina, G. E. Holder, M. A. Johnson, D. L. McCulloch, T. Meigen, S. Viswanathan: ISCEV standard for clinical pattern electroretinography (PERG): 2012 update. In: Documenta Ophthalmologica. Band 126, Nr. 1, 2013. S. 1–7.

References

External links
 Homepage of Michael Bach
 Profile from the Homepage of the Freiburg University Eye Clinic
 Profile from the Homepage of GWUP, the German equivalent of The Skeptics Society and the Committee for Skeptical Inquiry
 Homepage of Bach's Visual Phenomena & Optical Illusions
 Homepage of Bach's on-line tests of visual acuity (‘FrACT’)

1950 births
20th-century scientists
21st-century scientists
German biophysicists
German ophthalmologists
Academic staff of the University of Freiburg
Scientists from Berlin
Vision scientists
Optical illusions
Living people